John Lawrence Pritchard (born 22 April 1948) is a Church of England bishop. He was the Bishop of Oxford from 2007 to 2014. He is in the Open Evangelical tradition.

Early life
Pritchard was born in Salford, Lancashire. He was educated at Arnold School, then an all-boys direct grant grammar school in Blackpool, Lancashire. He read jurisprudence at St Peter's College, Oxford, graduating with a Bachelor of Arts (BA) degree in 1970; as per tradition, his BA was promoted to an Oxford Master of Arts (MA Oxon) in 1973.

In 1970, Pritchard entered Ridley Hall, Cambridge, an Anglican theological college. He then studied theology and trained for ordination for the next two years. In 1972, he received a Certificate in Pastoral Theology.

Ordained ministry
Pritchard was ordained in the Church of England as a deacon in 1972 and as a priest in 1973. From 1972 to 1976 he served as a curate at St Martin in the Bull Ring, Birmingham and, from 1976 to 1980, he was Youth Chaplain and Assistant Director of Education in the Diocese of Bath and Wells. In 1980 he became priest in charge of Wilton, Taunton.  From 1988 he was Director of Pastoral Studies at Cranmer Hall, Durham and, from 1993, the college's warden. In 1996, he became Archdeacon of Canterbury and a canon residentiary of Canterbury Cathedral.

Episcopal ministry
In January 2002, Pritchard was consecrated as a bishop by David Hope, the Archbishop of York. Then, from 2002 to 2007, he served as the Bishop of Jarrow, a suffragan bishop in the Diocese of Durham.

On 11 December 2006 it was announced that Pritchard would become the 42nd Bishop of Oxford. Having taken office at his confirmation-of-election in London on 23 March 2007, he began his ministry in the diocese on 8 June 2007 after a service of inauguration at Christ Church Cathedral, Oxford.  In 2008, he supported the application by Muslims in Oxford to broadcast the adhan from the minaret of a mosque.  As a result, he received hostile comments and letters of complaint.

John Pritchard retired as Bishop of Oxford on 31 October 2014. In 2015, he was appointed an honorary assistant bishop of the Diocese of Durham.

On 11 February 2017, Pritchard was one of 14 retired bishops to sign an open letter to the then-serving bishops of the Church of England. In an unprecedented move, they expressed their opposition to the House of Bishops' report to General Synod on sexuality, which recommended no change to the church's canons or practices around sexuality. By 13 February, a serving bishop (Alan Wilson, Bishop of Buckingham) and nine further retired bishops had added their signatures; on 15 February, the report was rejected by synod.

Personal life
Pritchard married Wendy in 1972.   The couple have two daughters, Amanda and Nicola. Following retirement Pritchard and his wife live in Richmond, North Yorkshire.

Styles
 The Reverend John Pritchard (1972–1996)
 The Venerable John Pritchard (1996–2002)
 The Right Reverend John Pritchard (2002–present)

Writings
Practical Theology in Action, SPCK (1996), 
The Intercessions Handbook, SPCK (1997), 
Beginning Again, SPCK (2000), 
Living the Gospel Stories Today, SPCK (2001), 
How to Pray, SPCK (2002), 
The Second Intercessions Handbook, SPCK (2004), 
Living Easter Through the Year, SPCK (2005), 
How to Explain Your Faith, SPCK (2006), 
The Life and Work of a Priest, SPCK (2007) 
 Going to Church, SPCK (2009) 
 God Lost and Found, SPCK (2011) Why Christianity Makes Sense'', SPCK (2014) , eBook

References

External links

Diocese of Oxford website
Video of Pritchard's inauguration

1948 births
Living people
People educated at Arnold School
Alumni of Ridley Hall, Cambridge
Alumni of St Peter's College, Oxford
Academics of Durham University
Archdeacons of Canterbury
Bishops of Jarrow
Bishops of Oxford
21st-century Church of England bishops
Staff of Cranmer Hall, Durham